Orient Islamic School is an independent Muslim school situated in Greyville, Durban, South Africa.

Orient School is part of the Orient Islamic Educational Institute that was established in 1938. The school was established in 1959 as a state-aided school. In 1998, the school became an independent school.

The school currently offers the matriculation through the National Senior Certificate. It caters for learners from Grade RR-1

Gallery

Islamic schools in South Africa
Private schools in KwaZulu-Natal
Educational institutions established in 1959
1959 establishments in South Africa
High schools in South Africa
Education in Durban